Sułkowice  is a village in the administrative district of Gmina Andrychów, within Wadowice County, Lesser Poland Voivodeship, in southern Poland.

The village has a population of 4,835.

References

Villages in Wadowice County